Hugh D. Crawford (born October 23, 1941) is a Republican politician from Michigan who served on the Oakland County, Michigan Board of Commissioners as the Commissioner for District 9 which includes the cities of Novi, Northville, and the Township of Novi. Crawford is a former member of the Michigan House of Representatives where he served for three terms. He was the chairman of the powerful Committee on Regulatory Reform where he was a key player in enacting the reform policies pushed by Michigan Governor Rick Snyder.

Prior to his election to the House, from 1996-2000 Crawford was mayor of Novi, and Crawford served on the Novi City Council and the Oakland County Board of Commissioners.

References

1941 births
Living people
Republican Party members of the Michigan House of Representatives
County commissioners in Michigan
Michigan city council members
People from Novi, Michigan